The Alexandrine Sinodos (or Clementine Heptateuch) is a Christian collection of Church Orders. This collection of earlier texts dates from the 4th or 5th century CE. The provenience is Egypt and it was particularly used in the ancient Coptic and Ethiopian Christianity.

Manuscript tradition
The original text, which was probably written in Greek is now lost. Translation in Ge'ez, Bohairic Coptic, Sahidic Coptic and Arabic remain extant.

The Sahidic translation is found in British Museum manuscript or.1820, dated 1006, and was published in 1883 by Paul de Lagarde. A new edition was published in 1954 by Till and Leipold The Sahidic version lacks of some prayers found in other manuscripts.

The Arabic translation is complete and dates to before 1295 CE. It is found in Vaticanus manuscript ar.149, and was published in 1904 by George William Horner. Later editions were published by J. Perier in 1912 and Turnhout in 1971.

The Ge'ez translation, which dates from the 13th century, is a complete copy of the original with additional interpolations. It is found in British Museum manuscript or.793, and was published in 1904 by George William Horner.

The Bohairic translation was made in 1804 from the Sahidic text, and was published in 1848 by Henry Tattam.

The more ancient translations are the Sahidic and Arabic versions (probably both coming through a common lost Sahidic version of about 500 CE). The Ge'ez version is derived from the Arabic one

Content
The Alexandrine Sinodos is a collection of Church Orders, usually divided in seven books. It is so composed:
 Book 1 includes the Apostolic Church-Order
 Books 2 and 3 include the Egyptian Church Order (better known as Apostolic Tradition)
 Books 4 to 7 include the eighth book of the Apostolic Constitutions, without the last chapter (Canons of the Apostles) and without the liturgical prayers.

The numbering of the chapters is different in each version. The Sahidic and Bohairic versions divide the Apostolic Church-Order in 30 chapters, while the Arabic and Ge'ez versions divide it in 20 chapters. The Sahidic and Bohairic versions have the Apostolic Tradition from the 31 to 62, while the Arabic and Ge'ez versions from 21 to 47.

See also
 Apostolic Constitutions
 Verona Palimpsest

Notes

External links
G.W. Horner, The statutes of the apostoles or Canones Ecclesiastici,  1904: English text of the Ge'ez version (at pages 127-232), of Arabic version (at pages 233-293) and of the Sahidic version (at pages 295-363)
Henry Tattam The Apostolical Constitutions, or Canons of the Apostles 1848: English text of the Bohairic version

Ancient church orders
5th-century Christian texts